"Castles in the Air" is a song by American singer-songwriter Don McLean, which he originally released as a single in 1971 and subsequently re-recorded and re-released a decade later. The song describes a man who is unsatisfied with and weary of an urban lifestyle.  Although native to the city, he decides to forsake not only his urban 'castle in the air' but also his love interest there.  Because of his desire for and love of a country life, he decides to seek romance with a like-minded woman.

History

Originally recorded in 1970, "Castles in the Air" was McLean's first American single release, preceding "American Pie". The original version of "Castles in the Air" was included on the Tapestry album. In February 1971, it was released as the first single from the album and reached No. 40 on the Billboard Easy Listening/Adult Contemporary chart. After the success of the "American Pie" single, "Castles in the Air" was included as the B-side to its follow-up, "Vincent", and received enough radio airplay to reach the Hot 100 chart as a "flip".

In 1981, McLean re-recorded and re-released "Castles in the Air". The new version of the song, a slower ballad version compared with the more mid to uptempo version of the original, first appeared on his album Believers, and later replaced the original version on some copies of Tapestry.  Billboard praised the "soft guitar backdrop and tender vocal." Record World said that "this gentle, rolling ballad has a timeless sound." The new rendition was more successful, becoming a Top 40 hit in the US (No. 36 Billboard and No. 31 Cash Box), and reaching No. 11 in Australia. It was also a top 10 hit on the Adult Contemporary charts of both the US (No. 7) and Canada (No. 2). "Castles in the Air" became McLean's final pop hit before his genre shift to country music in the mid-1980s.

Chart performance

Weekly charts

Year-end charts

References

External links
 

Don McLean songs
1971 debut singles
1981 singles
Pop ballads
Songs written by Don McLean
Millennium Records singles
1970 songs
1970s ballads